Fraser Harrison is an English writer.

Bibliography
 The Yellow Book, Sidgwick and Jackson, London, 1974
 The Dark Angel - Aspects of Victorian Sexuality, Sheldon Press, London, 1977 
 Strange Land; The Countryside - Myth and Reality, Sidgwick and Jackson, London, 1982
 A Father's Diary, Flamingo, London, 1985
 The Living Landscape, Pluto, London, 1986
 A Winter's Tale, Collins, London, 1987
 Trivial Disputes, Collins, London, 1989
 High on the Hog, Heinemann, London, 1991, 
 Minotaur in Love, Flambard Press, Hexham, 2007, 
 Infinite West: Travels in South Dakota, South Dakota State Historical Society Press, Pierre, SD, 2012, 
 Portrait of Yankton, South Dakota History, Spring Issue, 2014.

Radio Plays:
 Come the Day! (the execution of Ken Saro-Wiwa) Radio 4, 1998
 Voyage of Discovery (based on journals of Lewis and Clark), Radio 3, 2000

External links
 Fraser Harrison Travel Writing
 Fraser Harrison Infinite West

Living people
English non-fiction writers
20th-century English novelists
21st-century English novelists
English travel writers
English dramatists and playwrights
Alumni of the University of Essex
English lawyers
English male dramatists and playwrights
English male novelists
People from Walsham-le-Willows
20th-century English male writers
21st-century English male writers
English male non-fiction writers
Year of birth missing (living people)